The High Commission of Malawi in London is the diplomatic mission of Malawi in the United Kingdom.

References

Malawi
Diplomatic missions of Malawi
Malawi–United Kingdom relations
Buildings and structures in the London Borough of Camden
Holborn